The 1935–36 Duke Blue Devils men's basketball team represented Duke University during the 1935–36 men's college basketball season. The head coach was Eddie Cameron, coaching his eighth season with the Blue Devils. The team finished with an overall record of 20–6.

References 

Duke Blue Devils men's basketball seasons
Duke
1935 in sports in North Carolina
1936 in sports in North Carolina